Davenport is a city in Polk County, Florida, United States. The population was 9,040 at the 2020 census. While the city of Davenport itself is very small, the area north of the city close to Interstate 4 and US 27 is experiencing explosive growth. It is part of the Lakeland–Winter Haven Metropolitan Statistical Area. The current mayor is H.B. "Rob" Robinson, who was appointed in February 2018. Per the City Charter, Mayor Robinson beat former Mayor Darlene Bradley capturing 69.8% of the vote in the municipal election in April 2019.

History
The settlement in the area now known as Davenport was established in 1838 when the US military set up Fort Davenport during the Second Seminole War, about 12 miles north of the present site of Davenport. The fort was one of a number built at 20 mile intervals along a trail from Fort Brooke to Fort Mellon.  The fort only lasted a few years.  The fort was named for Colonel William Davenport, who served as the local U.S. commander in the war.  There is no known documentary evidence to support an alternative claim that the city was named for a railroad conductor.

The modern city of Davenport had its start in the 1880s when the South Florida Railroad was extended to that point.  The settlement was first known as Horse Creek, for the creek first recorded on a US Army survey of 1849 which flows past the site to enter Snell Creek and eventually Lake Hatchineha in the Kissimmee River system.  A post office was established at Horse Creek in 1884, and the name of the post office was changed to Davenport in 1886. Davenport was incorporated in 1915.

The South Florida Railroad opened a station half a mile north of the present site of the city. The railroad line was acquired by the Plant System in 1893, and the Atlantic Coast Line Railroad in 1902. In 1926, it was replaced by a new station in the downtown area. It was later closed in the 1970s. From 1958 to 1986 there was a second station, the Vertagreen Railroad Station, opened only for the transportation of fertilizer and not for public use.

Geography and climate
Davenport is located within the Central Florida Highlands area of the Atlantic coastal plain with a terrain consisting of flatland interspersed with gently rolling hills.

Davenport is located in the humid subtropical zone, as designated by (Köppen climate classification: Cfa).

Demographics

As of the census of 2000, there were 1,924 people, 708 households, and 536 families residing in the city. The population density was 1,230.5 inhabitants per square mile (476.2/km2). The racial makeup of the city was 86.85% White, 6.91% African American, 0.57% Native American, 0.31% Asian, 4.52% from other races, and 0.83% from two or more races. Hispanic or Latino of any race were 11.12% of the population.

There were 708 households, out of which 23.3% had children under the age of 18 living with them, 62.7% were married couples living together, 8.9% had a female householder with no husband present, and 24.2% were non-families. 20.8% of all households were made up of individuals, and 12.1% had someone living alone who was 65 years of age or older. The average household size was 2.55 and the average family size was 2.90.

In the city, the population was spread out, with 20.7% under the age of 18, 7.4% from 18 to 24, 21.3% from 25 to 44, 22.0% from 45 to 64, and 28.6% who were 65 years of age or older. The median age was 46 years. For every 100 females, there were 89.4 males. For every 100 females age 18 and over, there were 86.4 males.

The median income for a household in the city was $29,408, and the median income for a family was $41,000. Males had a median income of $31,341 versus $25,492 for females. The per capita income for the city was $15,544. About 7.2% of families and 10.8% of the population were below the poverty line, including 10.6% of those under age 18 and 10.8% of those age 65 or over.

In 2010 Davenport had a population of 2,888. The racial and ethnic composition of the population was 58.6% non-Hispanic white, 10.8% black or African American, 0.5% Native American, 0.5% Filipino, 0.6% other Asian, 0.2% Samoan, 0.2% non-Hispanics reporting some other race, 2.8% reporting two or more races and 28.8% Hispanic or Latino. No one Hispanic group formed a majority of the population with 12.7% being Puerto Rican, 12.1% being Mexican and the remaining 3.9% of the population that was Hispanic scattered among several different groups.

Economy
The area around Davenport in northeast Polk County used to be centered on the remote Circus World amusement park.  It was redeveloped in 1987 into Boardwalk and Baseball and included a minor league baseball park that would attract spring training and minor league baseball teams for the Kansas City Royals, earning the area the moniker "Baseball City".  The amusement park failed in 1990, and the Royals left for Arizona and the Cactus League in 2003. The Baseball City name is now extinct, and the area around the stadium (which was demolished in 2005) has been redeveloped into Posner Park, a large outdoor shopping mall.

Transportation

  – Located 8 miles north of town, this freeway provides access westward to Lakeland and Tampa, and eastward to the Walt Disney World Resort and Orlando.
  – This main north/south route cuts through the center of town, leading northward to Kissimmee and southward to Haines City.
  – Located a few miles west of town, US 27 provides access to I-4 going northward, and leads southward to Haines City and Lake Wales.

Railroads have always been a part of Davenport's history, and freight and passenger trains still run through the city, although the railroad stations have been closed for many years. The former ACL main line which ran through the city is now part of the CSX Carters Subdivision.

References

External links
Official City Website

Cities in Polk County, Florida
Cities in Florida